"The Trees" is a song by Canadian rock band Rush, from its 1978 album Hemispheres. The song is also featured on many of Rush's compilation albums, and was long a staple of the band's live performances. On the live album Exit...Stage Left, the song features an extended acoustic guitar introduction titled "Broon's Bane."

Rolling Stone readers voted the song number 8 on the list of the 10 best Rush songs.
 
Live365 ranked it the tenth best Rush song.
 
Classic Rock readers voted "The Trees" the band's 11th best song.

Lyrics
The lyrics relate a short story about a conflict between maple and oak trees in a forest. The maple trees want more sunlight, but the oak trees are too tall. In the end, "the trees are all kept equal by hatchet, axe, and saw."

Rush drummer and lyricist Neil Peart was asked in the April/May 1980 issue of the magazine Modern Drummer if there was a message in the lyrics, to which he replied, "No. It was just a flash. I was working on an entirely different thing when I saw a cartoon picture of these trees carrying on like fools. I thought, 'What if trees acted like people?' So I saw it as a cartoon really, and wrote it that way. I think that's the image that it conjures up to a listener or a reader. A very simple statement."

See also
List of Rush songs

References

1978 singles
Rush (band) songs
Songs about trees
Song recordings produced by Terry Brown (record producer)
Songs written by Neil Peart
Songs written by Geddy Lee
Songs written by Alex Lifeson
1978 songs